Viktor Alekseyevich Ozerov (5 January 1958), is a Russian statesman and former army officer who served as member of the Federation Council from 1996 to 2019, and a chairman of the Federation Council Committee on Security and Defense from 2001 until 2017.

Biography

Viktor Ozerov was born on 5 January 1958.

In 1979, he graduated from the Novosibirsk Higher Military-Political School named after the 60th anniversary of the Great October Revolution. He served as deputy company commander for political affairs, deputy commander for political affairs of a separate battalion in the Southern Group of Forces based in Budapest, and a deputy commander of a training battalion for political affairs in the Carpathian Military District.

From 1989 to 1991, after graduating from the Lenin Military-Political Academy, he served as deputy commander of a military unit for political affairs in the Far Eastern Military District in Vyazemsky.

From 1991 to 1994, he was the Chairman of the Vyazemsky District Council.

On 31 March 1994, Ozerov was elected a member of parliament, a deputy of the Khabarovsk Krai Duma of the first convocation, and became the chairman of the Khabarovsk Krai Duma until 2001. In January 1996, Ozerov became a member of the Federation Council. In 2001, a was proclaimed a representative in the Federation Council from the legislative authority of the Khabarovsk Krai. He was a Chairman of the Russian Federation Council Committee on Security and Defense in from 2001 to 2017. Since November 2019, he has been appointed advisor to the head of the Russian Social and Political Center Foundation (ROSPOLITIKA).

Military service

He was last ranked a colonel, when he left the army in 1991.

Education

He is a candidate of Legal Sciences.

Family

He is married has a son and a daughter. His daughter, Marina is the deputy Head of the Organizational Directorate - and the Head of the Department of the Office of the Federation Council.

References

1958 births
Living people
People from Abakan
Lenin Military Political Academy alumni
Recipients of the Order "For Merit to the Fatherland", 4th class
Recipients of the Order of Honour (Russia)
Recipients of the Order of Honour (Moldova)
Recipients of the Order of the Rising Sun, 3rd class
Soviet colonels
Members of the Federation Council of Russia (1996–2000)
Members of the Federation Council of Russia (after 2000)
Russian individuals subject to the U.S. Department of the Treasury sanctions
Russian individuals subject to European Union sanctions